Below is the list of the winners at the Denmark Open in badminton in women's singles.

References
Alle tidligere vindere af Denmark Open (tidl. Danish Open) 
tournamentsoftware.com Denmark Super Series 2010
tournamentsoftware.com Yonex Denmark Open (2011 Super Series Premier)

Denmark Open
Lists of sportswomen